The following is an independently list of best-selling albums in Brazil. This list can contain any types of album, including studio albums, extended plays, greatest hits, compilations, various artists, soundtracks and remixes. The list is divided by claimed sales from diverse sources media and certified units from Pro-Música Brasil when their certification program started in 1990; and thereafter by domestic (over 1 million) and international artists (over half-million).

Historically, Brazilian market have been dominated by their local artists and music. In 1996, Associação Brasileira dos Produtores de Discos (ABPD and now Pro-Música Brasil) informed that Brazilian music represented 72% of record sales across the nation. Brazil has always stayed as the largest music market in both Latin America and South America. As of 2018, was the world's 10th largest music market according to the International Federation of the Phonographic Industry (IFPI).

Numerous artists have multiplies entries led by Marcelo Rossi and Roberto Carlos with four albums reaching the million mark, while É o Tchan!, Só Pra Contrariar and Legião Urbana each have two. Rossi also has the highest certified diamond album, with Ágape Musical (2011) which received 4× Diamond from Pro-Música Brasil. According to Folha de S.Paulo, the million mark in the country was relatively common until 1998, when sales decreased due piracy.

Best-selling albums (domestic artists) 
Numerous albums by Brazilian artists have sold more than half-million based both in certified units and actual sales. By extension, this list of domestic repertoire is only limited to those albums with one or more million copies sold.

By certified units (since 1990)

Best-selling albums by international artists 

Based on certified units when Pro-Música Brasil began their certification program in 1990, Serious Hits... Live! and The Bodyguard are the highest-selling international albums with 750,000 copies each, while Madonna and Backstreet Boys are the foreign acts with more albums certified with the half-million mark. Instead, diverse albums by foreign artists reached similar or significantly major sales before that. Although precise sales figure is hard to obtain, De niña a mujer by Julio Iglesias is credited by some sources as the best-selling album in Brazil by an international artist. Iglesias and Michael Jackson are the only acts with two or more albums with 1 million claimed sales across the country. According to publications like Época, True Blue by Madonna is credited as the best-selling album by an international female artist. She has also multiple entries based both in claimed sales or certified units.

By certified units (since 1990) 
*Positions based on certified sales and release year.

By claimed sales 

Most examples here are albums released before the existence of certification program started in 1990 by Pro-Música Brasil. However, some of them received retroactively certifications by the organization.

Best-selling artists in and from Brazil

International acts
A list of the best-selling acts in Brazil with record sales up to 2 million copies and limited to the Top 10.

*Updated as of January 18, 2023

Best-selling Brazilian artists
A list of the best-selling Brazilian artists, with over 40 million on claimed sales and limited to the Top 10.

See also

Notes

References

Brazil
Brazilian music
Brazil music-related lists